Edward Langworthy (1738–1802) was an American Founding Father and teacher who was a delegate to the Continental Congress from Georgia. He signed the Articles of Confederation.

Langworthy was born in Savannah, Georgia, in 1738. Nothing is known of his ancestors since he was a foundling. He was raised in the Bethesda Orphan House at Savannah and was educated in the school there. He later taught in that same school. Since he was born only five years after James Oglethorpe shipped the first colonists to Georgia, it is likely that his parents were included with those recruited from debtors' prisons or poorhouses.

Langworthy began working with Georgia's Committee of Safety and was their secretary when they became a revolutionary Council of Safety on December 11, 1775. The Georgia assembly sent him to the Continental Congress in 1777, and he arrived in time to sign the Articles of Confederation. He served in the Congress until 1779.

Edward moved to Baltimore, Maryland, in 1785. He married a young lady named Wright, and the couple had four children. He also bought a part interest in a newspaper The Maryland Journal & Baltimore Advertiser and became its editor. In 1787, he sold his interest and became an instructor at the Baltimore Academy.

In 1795, Langworthy was made the clerk of customs for Baltimore, a post he held until his death. He died of yellow fever on November 2, 1802, and was buried at the Old Episcopal Church. The church was torn down in 1891, and details of any re-interment are unknown.

External links

1738 births
1802 deaths
Deaths from yellow fever
Continental Congressmen from Georgia (U.S. state)
18th-century American politicians
Signers of the Articles of Confederation
Infectious disease deaths in Maryland
Founding Fathers of the United States